Stefan Sultana (born 18 July 1968 in Ħamrun, Malta) is a retired professional footballer, who played the majority of his career for Ħamrun Spartans as a striker. He also had a three-year spell with Hibernians. Following the 2008–09 season he announced his retirement from football.

He is the all-time top scorer in the Maltese Premier League having scored 195 goals.

Honours

Ħamrun Spartans
 Maltese Premier League: 1986–87, 1987–88, 1990–91 
 Maltese FA Trophy: 1982–83, 1983–84, 1986–87, 1987–88, 1988–89, 1991–92

Hibernians
 Maltese Premier League: 2001–02

Career statistics

International goals

References

External links
 

Living people
1968 births
Maltese footballers
Malta international footballers
Ħamrun Spartans F.C. players
Hibernians F.C. players
Association football forwards